Björn Ziegenbein (born 30 April 1986) is a German former professional footballer who played as a midfielder.

Career
Ziegenbein was born in Alzenau. He made his debut on the professional league level in the 2. Bundesliga for 1860 Munich on 29 March 2006 when he came on as a substitute for Slobodan Komljenovic in the 78th minute in a game against Wacker Burghausen.

On 5 August 2016, he signed a three-year contract with Energie Cottbus.

Career statistics

References

External links
 

1986 births
Living people
People from Alzenau
Sportspeople from Lower Franconia
German footballers
Footballers from Bavaria
Association football midfielders
Germany under-21 international footballers
Germany youth international footballers
2. Bundesliga players
3. Liga players
Regionalliga players
TSV 1860 Munich players
TSV 1860 Munich II players
SV Wehen Wiesbaden players
FC Hansa Rostock players
Hallescher FC players